Marian Filar (6 October 1942 – 1 June 2020) was a Polish lawyer, academic and politician who served as a member of the Sejm from 2007 to 2011.

References

1942 births
2020 deaths
Nicolaus Copernicus University in Toruń alumni
Academic staff of Nicolaus Copernicus University in Toruń
Members of the Polish Sejm 2007–2011